The superfamily Siricoidea is an archaic group of the order Hymenoptera, consisting of six families (four extinct) of xylophagous sawflies. The group is well represented in early Tertiary and Mesozoic times, but a number of living taxa remain, including the family Anaxyelidae, which has recently been linked to this group (it was previously placed in the Xyeloidea). The female ovipositor is typically long and projects posteriorly, and is used to drill into wood.

Families
These six families belong to the superfamily Siricoidea:
 Siricidae (horntails)
 Xiphydriidae (wood wasps, sometimes treated as a separate superfamily, Xiphydrioidea)
 † Daohugoidae
 † Protosiricidae
 † Pseudosiricidae
 † Sinosiricidae

References

Sawflies
Hymenoptera superfamilies